Sorgschrofen is a  mountain in the Allgäu Alps of Bavaria, Germany. A lower summit of Sorgschrofen is the  Zinken. There is a summit cross on both Sorgschrofen and Zinken.

Quadripoint 

The summit is the only land link Jungholz has to the rest of Austria. A rare occurrence found on the summit is that four borders (two German and two Austrian) meet in a quadripoint:

 Bad Hindelang (West, Bavaria, Germany)
 Pfronten (East, Bavaria, Germany)
 Jungholz (North, Tyrol, Austria)
 Schattwald (South, Tyrol, Austria)

History 

The border between this section of Bavaria and Tyrol was defined by the border treaty of 1844, which was complemented in 1850: "Grenzberichtigungsvertrag vom 30. Jänner 1844, mit dem Ergänzungsvertrag vom 16. Dezember 1850". The treaty declares that the borders meet at border marker 110, which is carved into a stone on the summit of the mountain.

Ascent 

Sorgschrofen is a popular hiking mountain.

From Jungholz 

From Jungholz one can either take a ski lift to cut corners or hike up a path to Älpele Hut. From there one needs to follow the steep slope until reaching the area beneath the peak. Here one must climb up the rocky surface to the peak.

From Unterjoch 

Starting from the parking lot in Unterjoch, one walks past the church and goes east to Zehrerhöfe on a road, where the paving abruptly stops. A dirt path at a right angle leads to the main path to the peak. From there, the main path leads up the slope. It becomes much steeper, and some places are secured by steel wire. At one point one must squeeze through a crevice. After reaching Zinken, one must cross a ridge to get to the main summit. The path over the ridge is reserved for experienced hikers who are absolutely sure-footed, because although the path is partially secured, it is often very exposed. The trail can be icy until late spring. Before that, a climb—even for experts—is not recommended.

References

External links 

Hikr.org (in German): Many different tour guides and routes.

Allgäu Alps
Mountains of Bavaria
Mountains of the Alps
Mountains of Tyrol (state)
Quadripoints and higher
Austria–Germany border